The Roman Catholic Diocese of Hexham and Newcastle is a Latin Church diocese of the Catholic Church, centred on St Mary's Cathedral in the city of Newcastle upon Tyne in England. The diocese is one of the six suffragan sees in the ecclesiastical Province of Liverpool and covers the historic boundaries of County Durham and Northumberland.

History

The Diocese of Hexham was revived in 1850 by decree of Pope Pius IX, restoring the Catholic hierarchy to England and Wales. Although the ancient See of Hexham was founded in 678 it had later lapsed. Together with the See of Lindisfarne, founded by Saint Aidan, Hexham formed the main part of the Northumbrian kingdom's ecclesiastical structure. Among the early bishops elected to the see in 684 was Saint Cuthbert, the present-day patron of the modern diocese and, later, Acca of Hexham.

The modern diocese was expanded to include the title of Newcastle in 1861. Originally under the metropolitan See of Westminster, the diocese became part of the new Province of Liverpool (often referred to as the Northern Province) in 1911.

On the restoration of the diocese in 1850, Pius IX appointed Bishop William Hogarth, Vicar Apostolic of the Northern District, to be the first bishop of the diocese. The Parish Church of Saint Mary, Newcastle upon Tyne, designed by Augustus Welby Pugin, was selected as the seat for the new bishop, gaining cathedral status.

In 1924, Pope Pius XI withdrew the old counties of Cumberland and Westmorland to incorporate them into a newly created Diocese of Lancaster. For this reason, the Lancaster diocese still considers St Cuthbert as one of its principal patrons. Other territory was taken from the Archdiocese of Liverpool to form the new see.

Present

The modern Diocese of Hexham and Newcastle comprises the counties of Northumberland, Tyne and Wear and County Durham. In this respect, it comprises three cities: Newcastle upon Tyne, Durham and Sunderland.

The diocesan curia and chancery are officially based at Bishop's House, 26 West Avenue, Gosforth, in the north of Newcastle. However, the tribunal and other commissions are actually based at the curial offices at St Vincent's in St Cuthbert's House, West Road.

The diocese was also home to the regional seminary for the north of England, Ushaw College, near Durham. The seminary had strong links with the University of Durham which validated the degree courses offered there. The seminary was governed by the bishops of the Northern Province under the chairmanship of the Archbishop of Liverpool. However, as the local ordinary, the Bishop of Hexham and Newcastle always held the position of Vice-Chairman of Governors.

The diocesan patrons are Our Blessed Lady Immaculate (8 December) and Saint Cuthbert, Bishop and Confessor (20 March).

Current bishop

The See of Hexham and Newcastle is currently sede vacante following  Pope Francis' acceptance of the resignation of Robert Byrne in December of 2022.

There are presently 214 diocesan priests (57 of whom are retired) and six permanent deacons serving 183 parishes. A number of religious orders are also present in the diocese, including the Passionists, the Jesuits, the Carmelites, the Poor Clares and the Sisters of Mercy.

In 2005 Bishop Dunn reorganised the structure of the diocese and curia. He introduced five episcopal areas. These areas are arranged geographically and are known as Northumberland, Newcastle and North Tyneside, Sunderland and East Durham, South Tyneside, Gateshead and North West Durham, and Cleveland and South Durham. At the same time he appointed the man who would ultimately be his successor, Canon Seamus Cunningham, as vicar general. He also appointed a new chancellor for the curia and a new episcopal vicar for religious.

Following the death of Bishop Dunn on 1 March 2008, the College of Consultors elected Canon Seamus Cunningham as the Diocesan Administrator. On 9 January 2009 it was announced that Pope Benedict XVI had appointed him to be the new bishop of the diocese. He received his episcopal ordination on Friday, 20 March 2009 – the feast day of St. Cuthbert – the diocesan patron.

Bishops

Ordinaries

Vicars Apostolic of Northern District
See also Apostolic Vicariate of the Northern District (England).
James Smith (1688-1711)
George Witham (1716-1725)
Thomas Dominic Williams, O.P. (1725-1740)
Edward Dicconson (1740-1752)
Francis Petre (1752-1775)
William Walton (1775-1780)
Matthew Gibson (1780-1790)
William Gibson (1790-1821)
Thomas Smith (1821-1831)
Thomas Penswick (1831-1836)
John Briggs (1836-1840), appointed Vicar Apostolic of Yorkshire District
Henry Weedall (1840), did not take effect
Francis George Mostyn (1840-1847)
William Riddell (1847)
William Hogarth (1848-1850); see below

Bishop of Hexham
See also Bishop of Hexham and Newcastle, which includes Bishop of Hexham.
William Hogarth (1850-1861); see above & below

Bishops of Hexham and Newcastle
William Hogarth (1861-1866); see above
John Chadwick (1866-1882)
John William Bewick (1882-1886)
Henry O'Callaghan (1887-1889)
Thomas William Wilkinson (1889-1909)
Richard Collins (1909-1924)
Joseph Thorman (1924-1936)
Joseph McCormack (1936-1958)
James Cunningham (1958-1974)
Hugh Lindsay (1974-1992)
Michael Ambrose Griffiths, O.S.B. (1992-2004)
Kevin John Dunn (2004-2008), died in office
Séamus Cunningham (2009-2019)
Robert John Byrne, C.O. (2019-2022)

Coadjutor Vicars Apostolic
John Briggs (1833-1836)
William Maire (1767-1769), died without succeeding to see
Thomas Penswick (1824-1831)
Francis Petre (1750-1752)
William Riddell (1843-1847)
Thomas Smith (1807-1821)
William Walton (1770-1775)

Auxiliary Bishops
Richard Collins (1905-1909), appointed Bishop here
James Cunningham (1957-1958), appointed Bishop here
Hugh Lindsay (1969-1974), appointed Bishop here
 Richard Preston (1900-1904)
Owen Francis Swindlehurst (1977-1995), died in office
Thomas William Wilkinson (1888-1889), appointed Bishop here

Other priests of this diocese who became bishops
George Hilary Brown, appointed Vicar Apostolic of Lancashire District in 1840
George Crompton Ambrose Burton, appointed Bishop of Clifton in 1902
Robert Cornthwaite, appointed Bishop of Beverley in 1861
John Douglass, appointed Vicar Apostolic of London District in 1790
Charles Petre Eyre, appointed apostolic delegate and titular archbishop in 1868
Robert Gradwell, appointed Coadjutor Vicar Apostolic of London District in 1828
Bernard O'Reilly, appointed Bishop of Liverpool in 1873
James Sharples, appointed Coadjutor Vicar Apostolic of Lancashire District in 1843
Gregory Stapleton, appointed Vicar Apostolic of Midland District in 1800
William Turner, appointed Bishop of Salford in 1851
Nicholas Wiseman, appointed Vicar Apostolic of Midland District in 1840; future Cardinal
George Witham, appointed Vicar Apostolic of Midland District in 1702; later returned here as Vicar Apostolic

See also
Basil Hume – Cardinal Hume was a native son of Newcastle
Bishop of Lindisfarne
 List of Catholic churches in the United Kingdom
 Minsteracres

Notes and references

External links
Official diocesan website
Official cathedral website – St Mary's Cathedral, Newcastle upon Tyne
The Latin Mass Society in t Diocese of Hexham & Newcastle
Catholic Church in England and Wales official website
GCatholic.org

 
Religious organisations based in England
Religion in County Durham
Religion in Northumberland
Religion in Tyne and Wear
Hexham and Newcastle
Hexham and Newcastle
1850 establishments in England
Roman Catholic Ecclesiastical Province of Liverpool